Texephyr is the annual science and technology festival of Maharashtra Institute of Technology, Pune. Before 2014, there were various departmental events in the college. The event was founded as a common tech-fest for the entire college making it the first since 1983 when the college was established.

In its first year, Texephyr was launched with the aim of providing a platform for the Indian student community to develop and showcase their technical prowess, the departmental events of MIT aggregated into one of the largest college technical festivals of Pune. In its first year, the festival included over 20 competitions across technical and non-technical domains, seminars and workshops. The activities culminated in a grand three-day festival event in the month of February (20th to 22nd) within the campus of MIT Pune, which drew over 3000 from all over Pune and rest of the Maharashtra state; Including students, academia, corporates, and the spectators.

Texephyr hosts events of programming, website development, mobile application development, project exhibitions, paper presentations, robotics, RC motor design, robowars, quizzes and much more. The workshops conducted over the years are: “Ethical Hacking”, “Cloud Computing” ,“Eyebotics”, “Virtualization” ,“Robotsav”, “Automobile Dynamics”, and "Operating System & Computer Architecture", "Human Machine Interface (HMI) Design", "Internet of Things (IOT)", etc.

Currently, it is run by 3 branches of Engineering department which are:

 Electronics and Communication Engineering
 Computer Science Engineering
 Mechanical Engineering

References

External links 
 Official Website

Technical festivals in India